In field theory, a nonlocal Lagrangian is a Lagrangian, a type of functional  containing terms that are nonlocal in the fields , i.e. not polynomials or functions of the fields or their derivatives evaluated at a single point in the space of dynamical parameters (e.g. space-time). Examples of such nonlocal Lagrangians might be:
 
 
 
 The Wess–Zumino–Witten action.

Actions obtained from nonlocal Lagrangians are called nonlocal actions. The actions appearing in the fundamental theories of physics, such as the Standard Model, are local actions; nonlocal actions play a part in theories that attempt to go beyond the Standard Model and also in some effective field theories. Nonlocalization of a local action is also an essential aspect of some regularization procedures. Noncommutative quantum field theory also gives rise to nonlocal actions.

Quantum measurement
Quantum field theory
Theoretical physics